Ryan Napoleon (born 26 May 1990) is an Australian freestyle swimmer and Commonwealth Games medallist.

Career

Youth Swimming
Napoleon won gold in the 4×200m freestyle relay, silver in the 4×100m medley relay and bronze in the 100m butterfly whilst representing Australia at the Youth Olympic Festival.

At the 2008 Commonwealth Youth Games in Pune, India, Napoleon won gold in the 200m freestyle, 4×100m freestyle, 4×200m freestyle, 4×100m medley relays as well as silver in the 100m freestyle.

During the 2008 Oceania Swimming Championships held in Christchurch, New Zealand, Napoleon won gold in the 4×200m relay and bronze in the 200m butterfly.

Napoleon won the national 1500m title and became the sixth fastest Australian of all time at the 2009 Australian Swimming Championships.

2009 World Championships
At the 2009 World Championships, Napoleon placed 11th in the 1500m freestyle, 12th in the 800m freestyle, and 21st in the 400m freestyle.

2010 Telstra Australian Swimming Championships
At the 2010 Australian Championships Napoleon won silver medals in the 400m, 800m and 1500m freestyle events.

2010 Pan Pacific Championships and Commonwealth Games
Napoleon placed 9th in the 1500m, and was ranked 6th in the 400m freestyle at the Pan Pacific Swimming Championships.
At the 2010 Commonwealth Games Napoleon won silver in the 400m freestyle in a time of 3.48.59, and gold as part of the 4×200m freestyle relay team.

2011 Trials and Australian Swimming Championships 
At the 2011 Australian Swimming Championships, he won the 400m freestyle in a time of 3:45.16, making him the 4th fastest Australian 1500m swimmer of all time, behind Olympic Champions Ian Thorpe, Grant Hackett and Kieren Perkins

2011 World Championships 
In what could be described as an unlucky meet for Napoleon, he finished in 13th place for both the men's 400m and 800m freestyle.

2012 Olympic Trials and Australian Swimming Championships 
Napoleon secured his place in his maiden Olympic team when he earned 2nd place in the men's 400m freestyle at the 2012 Australian Swimming Championships. In both the heat and semi-finals of this event, Napoleon was to race against Australian swimming champion, Ian Thorpe who was making a comeback to swimming via this event. Despite both races receiving a high degree of media attention, Napoleon did not let this unnerve him. He swam impressively in his heat to become the top qualifier and later placed first in his semi-final race. To further cement Napoleon's Olympic dream, he placed 5th in perhaps what is the most competitive of the men's events, the 200m freestyle. This earned him a spot in the men's 4×200m relay team for the 2012 Summer Olympics in London.

At the Olympics, he finished 8th in the 400m freestyle, and was part of the Australian team that finished 5th in the  freestyle.

Doping ban
After Napoleon qualified to contest the 400m and 1500m freestyle at the 2010 Commonwealth Games in Delhi, swimming governing body FINA imposed a three-month doping ban on him due to a failed drug test taken in November 2009. Although FINA accepted an innocent mistake was made when Napoleon took incorrectly labelled asthma medication, it was decided that he would be ineligible for three months after the violation with the suspension commencing on 20 August 2010, meaning that he was unable to train with his squad and would be unable to compete in the Games.

Napoleon appealed the decision made by FINA to the Court of Arbitration of Sport (CAS) resulting in the ban being backdated to 15 June 2010.  Although he had missed out on vital training and preparation, Napoleon was then eligible to compete in Delhi where he claimed silver in the 400m freestyle and gold in the 4×200m relay.

See also
List of Commonwealth Games medallists in swimming (men)

References

External links
 
 
 
 
 

1990 births
Living people
Australian male freestyle swimmers
Swimmers from Sydney
Olympic swimmers of Australia
Swimmers at the 2012 Summer Olympics
Swimmers at the 2010 Commonwealth Games
Commonwealth Games gold medallists for Australia
Commonwealth Games silver medallists for Australia
Commonwealth Games medallists in swimming
Universiade medalists in swimming
Universiade gold medalists for Australia
Universiade bronze medalists for Australia
Doping cases in Australian swimming
Medalists at the 2013 Summer Universiade
Medallists at the 2010 Commonwealth Games